Aequoreidae is a family of hydrozoans, sometimes called the many-ribbed jellies or many-ribbed jellyfish. There are approximately 30 known species found in temperate and tropical marine coastal environments. Aequoreids include Aequorea victoria, the organism from which the green fluorescent protein gene was isolated.

Polyps
Only the polyp stages of  Aequorea species have been observed. The colonies are covered with chitinous periderm and can be either prostrate or erect with weak or sympodial branching. Young  possess  with a closing structure called operculum, which consists of several relatively long triangular folds that meet together in the centre when a disturbed polyp contracts. Because the operculum is quite fragile, hydrothecae of old polyps usually have only a small chitinous collar remaining. Comparatively large cylindrical  are attached to the colony with a thin peduncle. Commonly only one medusa develops in each gonotheca.

Medusae
Mature aequoreid medusae are diverse in shape, from lens-like to conical, and in size. The smallest, Aequerea parva is only 0.6 cm in diameter, while the largest, Rhacostoma atlanticum, can reach 40 cm in diameter. The medusae of most species are between 5 and 15 cm in diameter.

Genera
Aequoreidae includes the following genera:

 Aequorea Péron et Lesueur, 1810 – ca. 20 valid species
 Aldersladia Gershwin, 2006 – 1 valid species
 Gangliostoma Xu, 1983 – 2 valid species
 Rhacostoma L. Agassiz, 1850 – 1 valid species
 Zygocanna Haeckel, 1879  – 5 valid species

See also

 Aequorea tenuis
 Aequorea victoria

References

 
Cnidarian families
Leptothecata
Taxa named by Johann Friedrich von Eschscholtz